WFF may refer to: 

Wallops Flight Facility, a NASA facility
Well-formed formula, in logic, linguistics, and computer science, a symbol or string of symbols that is generated by the formal grammar of a formal language
Montreal World Film Festival
Woodhull Freedom Foundation & Federation, a nonprofit created "to affirm sexual freedom as a fundamental human right"
World's Funniest Fails, a U.S. TV series
 World Fitness Federation

See also 
WFF 'N PROOF, a game developed to teach principles of logic through well-formed formulas